Igor Khalilov (original name: Игорь Халилов, born ) is an Uzbekistani male weightlifter, competing in the +105 kg category and representing Uzbekistan at international competitions. He participated at the 1996 Summer Olympics in the +108 kg event and at the 2000 Summer Olympics in the +105 kg event and also at the 2004 Summer Olympics in the +105 kg event. He competed at world championships, most recently at the 2003 World Weightlifting Championships.

Major results

References

External links
 

1972 births
Living people
Uzbekistani male weightlifters
Olympic weightlifters of Uzbekistan
Place of birth missing (living people)
Weightlifters at the 1996 Summer Olympics
Weightlifters at the 2000 Summer Olympics
Weightlifters at the 2004 Summer Olympics
Weightlifters at the 1994 Asian Games
Weightlifters at the 1998 Asian Games
Weightlifters at the 2002 Asian Games
Asian Games medalists in weightlifting
Asian Games silver medalists for Uzbekistan
Asian Games bronze medalists for Uzbekistan
Medalists at the 1994 Asian Games
Medalists at the 1998 Asian Games
Medalists at the 2002 Asian Games
20th-century Uzbekistani people
21st-century Uzbekistani people